Targovishte Glacier is situated in Breznik Heights on Greenwich Island in the South Shetland Islands, Antarctica, east of Zheravna Glacier and southwest of Musala Glacier. It is bounded by Viskyar Ridge to the west, Vratsa Peak to the northeast, and Drangov Peak and Ziezi Peak to the east, extending 700 m in east-west direction and 1.6 km in north-south direction, and draining southwards into Bransfield Strait northeast of Sartorius Point.

The glacier is named after the city of Targovishte in northeastern Bulgaria.

See also
 List of glaciers in the Antarctic
 Glaciology

Location

Maps
 L.L. Ivanov et al. Antarctica: Livingston Island and Greenwich Island, South Shetland Islands. Scale 1:100000 topographic map. Sofia: Antarctic Place-names Commission of Bulgaria, 2005.
 L.L. Ivanov. Antarctica: Livingston Island and Greenwich, Robert, Snow and Smith Islands. Scale 1:120000 topographic map.  Troyan: Manfred Wörner Foundation, 2009.

References
 Targovishte Glacier. SCAR Composite Gazetteer of Antarctica
 Bulgarian Antarctic Gazetteer. Antarctic Place-names Commission. (details in Bulgarian, basic data in English)

External links
 Talev Glacier. Copernix satellite image

Glaciers of Greenwich Island